Pleck railway station was a station built on the London and North Western Railway in 1881, on the connecting line between the Grand Junction Railway and the South Staffordshire Line. It served the Pleck area of Walsall, and was located just off Bescot Road, between the Slaney Road and Slaters Lane junctions.

The station closed in 1917, only to reopen in 1924. It was closed permanently in 1958. The lines through the station are in use today as part of the Walsall-Wolverhampton Line for freight only.

References

Disused railway stations in Walsall
Railway stations in Great Britain opened in 1881
Railway stations in Great Britain closed in 1958
Former London and North Western Railway stations
1881 establishments in England